Ortona is a town and municipality in Chieti, Abruzzo, Italy

Ortona may also refer to:

 Ortona Lighthouse, in Ortona, Chieti, Abruzzo, Italy
 Basilica of St. Thomas the Apostle, Ortona, also known as Ortona Cathedral, in Ortona, Chieti, Abruzzo, Italy
 Ortona dei Marsi, a commune and town in L'Aquila, Abruzzo, Italy
 Ortona, Latium, a town in ancient Italy
 Ortona, Glades County, Florida, an unincorporated community in the United States
 Ortona Prehistoric Village, an archaeological site in Glades County, Florida, United States
 Ortona Mine and Battery, an historic mine in Queensland, Australia
 SS Ortona, a ship renamed RMS Arcadian in 1910